The feathered river garfish (Zenarchopterus dispar), also known as the estuarine halfbeak, spoon-fin garfish, spoon-fin river garfish and viviparous half beak, is a species of marine, freshwater, brackish and reef-associated oceanodromous viviparous halfbeak found in Indo-Pacific regional countries, such as Kenya, Mozambique, Seychelles, Madagascar, New Guinea, Solomon Islands, Australia, New Caledonia, Fiji, Sri Lanka, India, Vanuatu, Malaysia, Thailand, Singapore and Samoa.

Description
The species measured  SL in length. The body shows typical halfbeak shape with an elongated lower jaw and cylindrical elongated body. They have no spines on fins, but do have 11-12 rays of their dorsal fins and 12-13 rays on their anal fins. Pectoral fin is much shorter than head length. The longest recorded Jumping halfbeak was 34 cm long. Snout is uniform and brown in color. The fish can be found in found around mangroves and sheltered shallow areas, where juveniles are neustonic and can be seen floating on water.

See also
List of common commercial fish of Sri Lanka

References

 WoRMS
 A Survey of Reproductive Biology of Zenarchopterus dispar in Khanh Hoa Province, Vietnam
 Spoonfin river garfish – Zenarchopterus dispar

dispar
feathered river garfish